Sedgefield is a neighborhood of Charlotte, North Carolina, United States.
It is situated between Park Rd. and South Blvd and belongs to popular South End (Charlotte neighborhood).

Sedgefield is only 3 miles away from Charlotte Douglas International Airport and within walking distance to the Bank of America Stadium.
The core of the neighborhood is a mix of duplex housing and single-family homes along tree-lined streets.
Property values have been increasing faster than average due to the development along South Blvd.
Many of the homes in Sedgefield have been renovated or even rebuild from the ground and expanded.
In 2014 Redfin real estate brokerage predicts Sedgefield to be one of the Nation's "hottest neighborhoods" in terms of price development.

Area
Sedgefield has an area of 493 acres.
Sedgefield is bordering reputable Myers Park and Dilworth where Charlotte's largest hospital, Carolinas Medical Center, is located.

Demographics
Approx. 3200 people call Sedgefield home.
Median Age of its residents is 32 years.
Median household income in 2012 was US$70,000.
It has a strong Neighborhood Association representation.
There are many condo projects underway along its west side, spurred by the completion of the LYNX blue line of the Charlotte Light Rail.
The boom in residential development is expected to double the neighborhood's population of about 3,200 by the end of 2015.
Crime rate is below the County average.

Transportation infrastructure and sites of interest

Mass transit
98% of housing units are within a half mile of a transit stop.

The following buses from the Charlotte Area Transit System (CATS) serve Sedgefield:
 #12  (South Blvd.)
 #19 (Park Road)

The only Light Rail in the city runs through Sedgefield and connects its residents with the Inner City/Uptown. It is called LYNX blue line and Sedgefield's LYNX stop is New Bern Station.

Yet, Sedgefield remains one of Charlotte's most walk-able neighborhoods.

Roads
Park Road and South Blvd. are major thoroughfares leading into and out of Charlotte.
Sedgefield Park serves as a Pedestrian connection to bordering Dilworth.

Parks
Nearby Freedom Park is Charlotte's most popular 98 acres Public Park. It is the location of various events throughout the year, including the famous Festival in the Park.
Beautiful Sedgefield Park is a popular get away spot for locals. It has tennis courts, basketball courts, and a playground.

Education, Places of Faith and Economy

School system
Residents of Sedgefield attend Charlotte-Mecklenburg Schools, including Myers Park High School.
Sedgefield is also home to Sedgefield Middle and Sedgefield Elementary School.
The private Holy Trinity Catholic Middle School is located on Park Rd.

Library
Charlotte Mecklenburg Library is located at the South West Corner of Sedgefield.

Churches
Main churches in the neighborhood are Sedgefield United Methodist Church and Jehovah's Witnesses.

Businesses and local Economy
Nearby Restaurants and Grocery Stores are within walking distance.
Various Restaurants including a broad mix of small, locally owned Bar-type Diners as well as Asian Restaurants and even family run bakeries are lined up along South Blvd. and the extension of Park Rd. 
A 55,000-square-foot Publix supermarket is under construction on a 4-acre lot at 2300 South Blvd.
Sedgefield is home to one of Charlotte's most popular Microbrewery Triple C Brewing Company.

References

Neighborhoods in Charlotte, North Carolina